This is a summary of 1975 in music in the United Kingdom, including the official charts from that year.

Events
13 February - The film Slade In Flame, starring the members of Slade, premieres at the Metropole Theatre in London.
2 March - Los Angeles Police make a routine traffic stop that turns out to be Paul McCartney and his wife Linda. Linda is arrested for having 170 to 225 grams (six to eight ounces) of marijuana in her pocketbook.
22 March - The Shadows represent the UK in the Eurovision Song Contest in Stockholm, Sweden. They come second.
26 March - The film version of The Who's Tommy premieres in London.
7 April - Ritchie Blackmore plays a final show with Deep Purple in Paris before quitting to form his own group, Rainbow.
24 April - Pete Ham, founder of the group Badfinger, is found hanged in his London garage. His death is ruled a suicide.
1 May - The Rolling Stones announce their forthcoming North American tour by performing Brown Sugar from a flatbed truck on Fifth Avenue in New York City. The occasion was guitarist Ronnie Wood's debut with the band.
4 August - Robert Plant and his wife Maureen are seriously injured in a car accident while vacationing on the Greek island of Rhodes. The immediate future of Led Zeppelin is cast into doubt, as Plant will not recover for quite some time.
23 August - Peter Gabriel leaves progressive rock group Genesis.
3 October - The Who release their seventh studio album The Who By Numbers.
7 October - John Lennon finally wins his battle to stay in the United States after the New York Court of Appeals overturns Lennon's 1972 deportation order.
9 October - John Lennon and Yoko Ono become parents of Sean Ono Lennon at 2:00 AM. The birth heralds the beginning of John's temporary retirement from the music business as he vows to devote himself to family for the next five years.
31 October - Queen's "Bohemian Rhapsody" is released. It goes to No.1 for 9 weeks and as of 2015 is the biggest-selling non-Charity single in UK history.
6 November - The Sex Pistols play their first concert at St. Martin's School of Art in London.
18 December - The official break-up of Faces is announced at a London press conference. Rod Stewart will continue his solo career while Ronnie Wood joins The Rolling Stones.
25 December - Iron Maiden is formed, in Leyton, east London, by bassist Steve Harris.

Number Ones

Singles

Albums

Year-end charts
Between 30 December 1974 and 5 December 1975.

Best-selling singles

Best-selling albums
The list of the top fifty best-selling albums of 1975 were published in Music Week and in Record Mirror at the end of the year, and reproduced the following year in the first edition of the BPI Year Book in 1976. However, in 2007 the Official Charts Company published album chart histories for each year from 1956 to 1977, researched by historian Sharon Mawer, and included an updated list of the top ten best-selling albums for each year based on the new research. The updated top ten for 1975 is shown in the table below.

Notes:

Classical music: new works
Benjamin Britten - 
Phaedra
String Quartet No. 3

Film and Incidental music
Stanley Myers - Conduct Unbecoming, starring Michael York, Richard Attenborough and Trevor Howard.

Musical Films
The Who - Tommy.

Births
3 January - Rebecca Onslow, singer (Solid HarmoniE)
7 January - Neil Watts, singer (Code Red)
9 January - Glen Clarke, Irish singer (OTT)
13 January - Jason King, radio DJ
15 January – Edith Bowman, radio DJ
24 January 
Isobel Cooper, soprano
Paul Marazzi, singer (A1)
28 January - Lee Latchford-Evans, singer (Steps)
12 March - Kelle Bryan, singer (Eternal)
17 March - Justin Hawkins, vocalist (The Darkness)
25 March – Melanie Blatt, singer (All Saints)
1 April – Suzy Klein, music writer and presenter
23 May – Darren Styles, record producer
29 May - Melanie Brown, singer (Spice Girls)
4 June - Russell Brand, radio DJ
18 June - Jem, Welsh singer-songwriter and producer
23 June - KT Tunstall, singer-songwriter and guitarist
9 July - Shona Fraser, British-born music journalist
18 July - M.I.A., rapper and producer
15 August - Phillip Rodell, singer (Code Red)
4 September – Mark Ronson, DJ and music producer
8 September - Richard Hughes, drummer (Keane)
23 September – Chris Hawkins, radio DJ
9 October – Sean Ono Lennon, son of John Lennon and Yoko Ono
14 October - Shaznay Lewis, singer (All Saints)
25 October - Melissa Graham, singer (Solid HarmoniE)
5 November - Lisa Scott-Lee, singer (Steps)
14 November - Faye Tozer, singer (Steps)
25 November - Paul Mealor, composer
29 November - Alan Fitzsimons, Irish singer (OTT)
12 December - Michael Harwood, guitarist (Ultra)

Deaths
8 February - Martyn Green, actor and singer, 75
13 February - Eric Thiman, composer, 74
13 March – Jeannie Robertson, folk singer, 66/67
27 March - Sir Arthur Bliss, Master of the Queen's Musick, 83
14 April - Michael Flanders, lyricist, actor, humorist and singer (Flanders and Swann), 53 (intracranial berry aneurysm)
15 April - John D. H. Greenwood, film composer, 75
21 April - Sir Jack Westrup, musicologist, writer, teacher and occasional conductor and composer, 70
24 April - Pete Ham, singer and songwriter (Badfinger), 27 (suicide)
26 April - Godfrey Winham, English-born US music theorist and composer of contemporary classical music, 40
2 August - Muir Mathieson, conductor and composer, 64 (oesophageal cancer)

See also 
 1975 in British radio
 1975 in British television
 1975 in the United Kingdom
 List of British films of 1975

References 

 
British
British music by year